Lilian Popescu (born 15 November 1973) is a Moldovan football manager and former player who is currently the manager of FC Zimbru Chişinău.

Honours
Sheriff Tiraspol
Moldovan Super Cup: 2015

Petrocub Hîncești
Moldovan Cup: 2019–20

Individual
Coach of the year in Moldova: 2014

References

External links
 
 
 

1973 births
Living people
Moldovan footballers
Moldova international footballers
Association football midfielders
Moldovan football managers
FC Sheriff Tiraspol players
CSF Bălți players
People from Fălești District
FC Nistru Otaci managers
FC Tiraspol managers
CSF Bălți managers
FC Sheriff Tiraspol managers
CS Petrocub Hîncești managers
Moldovan Super Liga managers